Michael V. Leggiere is a professor of history who works at the University of North Texas as deputy-director for the Barsanti Center for Military History. Leggiere's emphasis is on the Napoleonic era, and he deals most specifically with Prussian operations in Germany and France during 1813-14. According to his university profile, Leggiere is "one of the leading historians in the world of the Napoleonic Wars." This is supported by the fact that Leggiere has received the International Napoleonic Society Literary Award two times, once in 2002 and again in 2007. Leggiere also serves on the program committee of the Society for Military History and is on the board of directors for the Consortium on Revolutionary Europe.

Career 
Leggiere is a 1997 graduate of Florida State University and has previously taught at Hawaii Pacific University, Louisiana State University, Shreveport and the Naval War College. While at Louisiana State University - Shreveport, Leggiere served as the chair of the Department of History and Social Sciences from 2005-2008. Leggiere is the author of Napoleon and Berlin: The Franco-Prussian War in North Germany, 1813 and The Fall of Napoleon. He is currently writing a book on the 1815 Waterloo campaign. He has written a biography of Blucher.

Awards
In 2002, he received the Société Napoléonienne Internationale's 2002 Literary Award. In 2004, he won the Society for Military History's Moncado Award, and in 2005 received the Société Napoléonienne Internationale Legion of Merit Award for Outstanding Contributions to Napoleonic Studies. For 2007, the Société Napoléonienne awarded him the First Place Literary Award, for the year's best work on Napoleon.

Selected works 
Napoleon and Berlin: The Franco-Prussian War in North Germany, 1813. Norman: University of Oklahoma Press, 2002. 
The Fall of Napoleon. Cambridge: Cambridge University Press, 2007.  
Blücher: Scourge of Napoleon. Norman: University of Oklahoma Press, 2014.

External links
Leggiere's Vitae
International Napoleonic Society

References

Living people
University of North Texas faculty
Year of birth missing (living people)